The Alledge Brook is a small watercourse in Northamptonshire in the East Midlands of England. It is a tributary of the River Nene.

Course

Alledge Brook rises as two small feeder streams north of Grafton Underwood and flows in a southerly direction through the centre of the village where it is embanked into a straightened, stone lined channel. It continues to flow in a southerly directly for approximately 3.5 km where it joins another small tributary that drains part of the Hanwood Park suburb of Kettering. At this point the brook begins to flow in an easterly direction towards the parish of Cranford where it forms the boundary between the twin villages of Cranford St. Andrew and Cranford St. John.

Shortly after leaving Cranford, the brook flows underneath the A14 dual carriageway and towards the hamlet of Woodwell, where it feeds an ornamental lake in the grounds of Woodford House. Continuing its journey eastwards, the brook flows through a mixture of arable and pastoral farmland before meeting the ford at Woodford, a popular local spot to dip in the brook, and historically a location where people would wash their vehicles. A sign has now been erected by the Environment Agency to warn against this practice.

The brook then continues to flow eastwards through arable farmland for approximately 3 km before joining the River Nene next to the A14 viaduct near Thrapston.

Status
In 2019, the overall classification of the Alledge Brook under the Water Framework Directive was 'Moderate', with reasons for not achieving good status including diffuse nutrient enrichment from the farmed environment and point source pollution from sewage discharge.

References

Alledge Brook